Ariel Pink (born Ariel Marcus Rosenberg on June 24, 1978) is a Los Angeles-based indie artist and musician. He boasts a cult following and endorsements from more widely known artists such as fellow founding Paw Tracks group Animal Collective.

Studio albums 
Haunted Graffiti original series

Haunted Graffiti reissued series

Later album releases

Collaborative albums 
Ariel Pink & R. Stevie Moore

Compilation albums

Other albums 
2006: Ariel Rosenberg's Thrash and Burn: Pre (Human Ear Music)
2006: Stranded at Two Harbors (credited as Holy Shit) (UUAR)
2010: Early Live Recordings (Human Ear Music)
2011: Ariel Pink's Picks Vol. 1 (R. Stevie Moore mixtape, curated by Nick Noto [APDS])

EPs and singles 
 2005: Pedestrian Pop Hits (Southern Records)
 2006: "Gates of Zion"/"Ghosts" (Australian Tour) (Mistletone)
 2006: "Witchhunt Suite for WW3" 12-inch (Melted Mailbox)
 2006: My Molly EP (Tiny Creatures)
 2006: Ariel Friedman EP (Human Ear Music)
 2008: "Before Today" UNUSUAL ANIMALS (Asthmatic Kitty)
 2008: "Can't Hear My Eyes"/"Evolution's a Lie" 7-inch (Mexican Summer)
 2009: "Kind of Kind"/"RSM's Brain" (Big Love, Japan)
 2009: "Reminiscences EP" (Cooler Cat)
 2010: "Round and Round"/"Mistaken Wedding" (4AD)
 2011: "I'm Not a Genius" (JesusWarhol)
 2012: Ku Klux Glam EP with R. Stevie Moore (Slowboy)
 2013: "Hang On to Life"/"No Real Friend" (Mexican Summer)
 2017: "Myths 002 EP" with "Weyes Blood" (Mexican Summer)
 2020: "Burned Out Love" (Mexican Summer)

Compilation appearances 
 2003: Want Me Homemade Hits (Kittridge Records)
 2004: Interesting Results (Sonic Arts Network)
 2005: Jules Lost His Jewels The Wire Tapper
 2005: Omen Light Dead Sea Compilation (LDS)
 2006: Every Night I Die at Miyagi's (Jan 6 Uncut sampler)
 2006: From U.S. to I (Ballbearings Pinatas)
 2007: Everybody Through the Wilderness: a tribute to Madonna (Manimal Vinyl)

Underground releases 
 1996: The Nile Pan pt. 1-11
 1996: Kids On Drugs
 1996: Kraftwerk / Experiments
 1996: Dove
 1997: Death Dorm 1–4 (comp)
 1997: tape 1
 1997: metamorfosi / INUMI
 1997: Equus 1 & 3
 1997: Master 1 & 2
 1997: Bianca Live / Demoes
 1998: Hum It in the Streets (Papermasche)
 1998: Ariel Rosenberg's Thrash n' Burn + PRE
 1998: Gorrilla Live 1 + Solo
 1998: Unreleased Gorrilla tape
 1998: Gorrila 2
 1998: Appleasians Vaults
 1998: Appleasians Greatest Hits
 1999: Appleasians Live / The Birth of Haunted Graffiti Demoes
 2000: Mother of God + Orange S*NS Live

Haunted Graffiti series

 1998: Haunted Graffiti – Cemetries / Railroads
 1999: Haunted Graffiti – Underground Double
 1999: Haunted Graffiti – Spiers in the Snow EP
 1999: Haunted Graffiti – Phantasm EP
 1999: Haunted Graffiti – Young Pilot Astray + Phantasm EP
 1999: Haunted Graffiti – Doldrums Sessions
 2000: Haunted Graffiti – Doldrums
 2003: Haunted Graffiti 7 – Holy Shit EP

Tour only

 2007: YAS DuDette (tour-only compilation of rarities)
 2007: Hot Saucers (tour-only compilation of rarities and outtakes)
 2008: Oddities Sodomies (tour-only compilation of rarities and outtakes)
 2008: Live at Pacific Palace Aids (tour-only live album)
 2009: Cooler Cat Bootleg (tour only EP)
 2009: Grandes Exitos (tour-only greatest hits)

Guest appearances 
 2000: Guitar, bass, drums, vocals, on Rebecca Lynn – Face Down in the Lap of Luxury (Headchange Records)
 2000: Guest vocalist on Centimeters – The Lifetime Achievement Awards (Skin Graft Records)
 2000: Guest appearance on R. Stevie Moore's – The Jinx, Report Card, Conscientious Objector (self released)
 2001: Mouth drums and bass on coL – 26 (JesusWarhol)
 2002: Bass on coL – Oh, Lindsay (JesusWarhol) and Forgotten (JesusWarhol)
 2004: Guest vocalist on All Night Radio – Spirit Stereo Frequency (Sub Pop)
 2004: Production credits on John Maus – Songs (Upset The Rhythm)
 2007: Guest appearance on Vibe Central – HitSongs (Human Ear Music)
 2008: Production credits on Gary War – New Raytheonport (SHDWPLY Records)
 2008: Mouth drums on Astrid Quay's version of The Cure's "The Caterpillar" on Perfect as Cats: a tribute to The Cure (Manimal Vinyl)
 2011: Vocals on Daft Punk/TRS-80 – "Sky Sailor (Float Away)" 
 2011: Vocals/Mouth Drums/Drum Loop/Bass/Guitar on Atheif – Similarly Different EP (JesusWarhol) 
2012: Music for "Daddy Don't Go" track on Raw Thrills Sick Steez album released on Sixteen Tambourines (Japan)
 2013: Guest appearance on "Suicide Mission" with Outer Limits Recordings on the "Birds, Bees, Babys, Bacteria" album
 2014: Bass on Cassie Ramone's The Time Has Come (Loglady)
 2015: Vocals, bass and keyboards on Soko – My Dreams Dictate My Reality (Because Music)
 2015: Vocals on Miley Cyrus – "Tiger Dreams", Miley Cyrus and Her Dead Petz
 2015: Vocals on Mild High Club – "The Chat" (Circle Star Records)
 2016: Featured on Drugdealer – "Easy to Forget" (Domino Records)
 2016: Featured on Theophilus London – "Revenge" (Fool's Gold Records)
 2017: Featured on Drugdealer – "Easy to Forget" (Domino Records)
 2018: Vocals, guitar, synth on MGMT – "She Works Out Too Much", " When You Die" on Little Dark Age (Columbia)
 2018: Featured on Part Time – "I Can Treat You Better" (Burger/Tough Love)
 2020: Vocals, Drums, Electric Guitar on Yung Lean "Starz"

References 

Discographies of American artists
Rock music discographies
disco